Silla Club de Fútbol is a Spanish football team based in Silla, in the Valencian Community. Founded in 1927, it plays in Tercera División RFEF – Group 6, holding home matches at Complejo Deportivo Municipal Vicent Morera.

History
Founded in 1927, Silla played in the regional leagues until 2016, when they achieved promotion to Tercera División. In the 2020–21 season, the club reached the play-offs, being eliminated by CD Roda.

Season to season

5 seasons in Tercera División
1 season in Tercera División RFEF

References

External links
 
Soccerway team profile

Football clubs in the Valencian Community
Association football clubs established in 1927
1927 establishments in Spain
Province of Valencia